Aspergillusol A is an alpha-glucosidase inhibitor isolated from marine Aspergillus. Structurally, it consists of an erythritol group in the center, with two hydroxyimino-phenylpropanoyl groups attached to it from either side. It was synthesized in 2010 by researchers from King Fahd University of Petroleum and Minerals, starting with 4-hydroxybenzaldehyde.

References

Alpha-glucosidase inhibitors
Ketoximes